Jamsheed Quli Qutb Shah (also transliterated in different ways) was the second ruler of the Sultanate of Golkonda under the Qutb Shahi dynasty. He ruled from 1543 to 1550.

His father, Sultan Quli Qutb-ul-Mulk, had established the dynasty and had become the first Muslim to rule over the entire Telugu region. In 1543, Jamsheed Quli Qutb Shah assassinated his father, blinded his older brother, the heir to the throne, and forced his other brother, Ibrahim Quli, to flee to Vijayanagar. Following his father's death, he did not proclaim himself sultan, but forced local chiefs to accept his suzerainty, while gaining some forts from the Baridis.

Little is known of Jamsheed's reign, but he is remembered as having been cruel. He died in 1550 from cancer.

References

   
   

1550 deaths
Kings of Golconda
Telugu people
Qutb Shahi dynasty
Year of birth unknown